Khatukay is a rural locality (an aul) in Khatukayskoye Rural Settlement of Krasnogvardeysky District, Adygea, Russia. The region was originally the homeland of the Hatuqwai Circassians, but none were left in the region after the Circassian genocide. The population was 5038 as of 2018. There are 59 streets.

Geography 
Khatukay is located 9 km northeast of Krasnogvardeyskoye (the district's administrative centre) by road. Ust-Labinsk is the nearest rural locality.

References 

Rural localities in Krasnogvardeysky District